Guliemina is a species of extinct ammonite from the Jurassic period in England. It lived during the Callovian period of the Jurassic, and its fossils are often found in the Kellaways rock strata of Chippenham, Wiltshire.

External links
 An example of a fossilized specimen

Jurassic ammonites